Luis María Estrada Paetau (May 26, 1935 – March 25, 2011) was the Roman Catholic bishop of the Roman Catholic Vicariate Apostolic of Izabal, Guatemala.

Born in Guatemala, Estrada Paetau O.P. was ordained a priest in 1961 in Salamanca (Spain) at the end of the studies of Theologie in the Faculty of San Esteban. In 1977, he was named a bishop and was named bishop of the Izabal Vicariate Apostolic in 1988. He resigned in 2004.

Notes

Guatemalan Roman Catholic bishops
1935 births
2011 deaths
Roman Catholic bishops of Izabal